Circular Pedestrian Bridge, also known as Ponte do Laço is a pedestrian steel bridge above the Canal de São Roque and the Canal dos Botirões, two of the channels of the Aveiro Lagoon. Designed by Luís Viegas and Domingos Moreira, the bridge features an "unusual" circular design that is supported in three margins and suspended by a mast. It opened to the public in May 2006.

See also
List of bridges in Portugal

References

Further reading

Pedestrian bridges in Portugal
Bridges in Aveiro District
Buildings and structures in Aveiro, Portugal